Fountains Square is a public square in downtown Baku, capital of Azerbaijan.
The square was previously called Parapet and is often referenced to by the same name now. The name of the fountains square derives from the presence of dozens of fountains throughout the square first constructed during Soviet rule of Azerbaijan.

The square is a public gathering place, especially after business hours and during the weekend. It is an attractive tourist destination with many boutiques, restaurants, shops, hotels and passage. It starts from the Istiglaliyyat Street and walls of the Icheri Sheher and stretches through Nizami Street, also called in popular culture as the Torgovaya street running parallel to Baku Boulevard. The fountains square is a location where the city authorities hold many public festivals, shows and celebrations.

In 2010, the square was renovated by Baku authorities. A "Fountains Square" salad has been named after the square.

Views of the Fountains Square

Notes

Squares in Baku
Architecture in Azerbaijan